The World English Bible (WEB) is an English translation of the Bible freely shared online. The translation work began in 1994 and was deemed complete in 2020. Created by volunteers with oversight by Michael Paul Johnson, the WEB is an updated revision of the American Standard Version from 1901.

The WEB has two main versions of the Old Testament: one with Deuterocanonical books and the other limited to Protocanonical books. The New Testament is the same in both versions.

History
In 1994, Michael Paul Johnson felt commissioned by God "to create a new modern English translation of the Holy Bible that would be forever free to use, publish, and distribute." Since he did not have formal training in this regard, he started to study Greek and Hebrew and how to use scholarly works. His first translated books were the gospel and letters of John, which he shared drafts of on Usenet and a mailing list, receiving some suggestions and incorporating them. Estimating he would be 150 years old by the time this style of work would be finished, Johnson prayed for guidance. The answer was to use the American Standard Version (ASV) of 1901 because it is regarded as an accurate and reliable translation that is fully in the public domain.

Johnson's main goal became modernizing the language of ASV, and he made custom computer programs to organize the process. This resulted in an initial draft of 1997 that "was not quite modern English, in that it still lacked quotation marks and still had some word ordering that sounded more like Elizabethan English or maybe Yoda than modern English." This draft was soon named World English Bible (WEB), since Johnson intended it for any English speaker, and the acronym indicates that the Web is the means of distribution.

Over the years, a number of volunteers assisted Johnson. The entire translation effort was deemed complete in 2020, and the only subsequent changes have been fixing a few typos.

Features

The translation philosophy of the WEB is to be mostly formally equivalent, like the American Standard Version it is based on, but with modernized English. The WEB also follows the ASV's decision to transliterate the Tetragrammaton, but uses "Yahweh" instead of "Jehovah" throughout the Old Testament. The British and Messianic editions of the WEB, as well as the New Testament and Deuterocanonical books use more traditional forms (e.g., the LORD).

The WEB has two main versions of the Old Testament: one limited to the Protocanonical books, while the other also includes the Deuterocanon (a.k.a. the Apocrypha). The New Testament is the same for both versions. There are a modest amount of footnotes for cross-references and brief translation notes.

Licensing
All of the text of the World English Bible is dedicated into the public domain. The ebible.org project maintains a trademark on the phrase "World English Bible" and forbids any derivative work that substantially alters the text from using the name "World English Bible" to describe it. The reasons given were that they felt copyright was an ineffective way of protecting the text's integrity and the fact that the Creative Commons licenses did not exist at the time the project began.

Critical reception

The Provident Planning web site uses the World English Bible because it is free of copyright restrictions and because the author considers it to be a good translation.

The Bible Megasite review of the World English Bible says it is a good revision of the American Standard Version of 1901 (ASV) into contemporary English, which also corrects some textual issues with the ASV.

The World English Bible is widely published in digital formats by a variety of publishers.

See also
 Literal English Version – A derivative of the WEB
 New American Standard Bible
 Open English Bible – A primarily digitally published translation
 Modern Literal Version – A primarily digitally published translation
 New English Translation – A primarily digitally published translation

References

External links

 Official website
 
 

2000 books
2000 in Christianity
Bible translations into English
Public domain books

simple:World English Bible